Margaret DeLacy Kelley (born July 9, 1996) is an American actress and singer. She is known for her role as Cindy Burman in the DC Universe series Stargirl.

Early life 
DeLacy was born and raised in Southern California. Her mother is Filipina.

Career
DeLacy has her own YouTube channel.

For her role in Woodstock or Bust, DeLacy was nominated in 2019 for Best Supporting Actress by the Lady Filmmakers Film Festival.

Starting in 2020, DeLacy stars as the villainous Cindy Burman in Stargirl.

Filmography

Film

Television

Discography

Singles

Promotional singles

Guest appearances

Music Videos

Guest appearances

References

External links

Living people
American television actresses
21st-century American actresses
21st-century American singers
American actresses of Filipino descent
1996 births